A speed square, also called a rafter square, rafter angle square, and triangle square, is a multi-purpose triangular carpenters' tool use for marking out. Its functions include many of those of a combination square, try square, and framing square. Carpenters use it to make basic measurements and mark lines on dimensional lumber, and as a saw guide for short 45 and 90 degree cuts.

The term "speed square" is a genericised trademark based on those owned by Swanson Tool Company which first manufactured and sold the tool.

History
Albert J. Swanson invented the A Speed Square in 1925 as a carpenter's layout tool. He later founded Swanson Tool Company to produce it. Today, Swanson Tool Company still manufactures and distributes the Speed Square and other carpentry tools from its headquarters in Frankfort, Illinois.

Design
Speed squares are manufactured from a variety of materials such as aluminum, steel, and composites such as HDPE. They are also made in several sizes, including 7-inch, 8-inch, 25-cm and 12-inch sizes.

Embedded degree gradations on the tool eliminate the need for trigonometric calculations and allow for lines to be more easily made.

The tool is an isosceles right triangle with a ruler on one equal side and a fence on the other. It is marked with the word Pivot at the right angle point and displays Degrees on its hypotenuse, Common and Hip/Val markings on its midsection. 

Degree indicates the angle in degrees from 0° to 90°.
Common indicates the rise in inches over a 12 inch run for common rafters from 1 inch to 30 inch.
Hip/Val indicates the rise in inches over a 17 inch run for hip or valley rafters from 1 inch to 30 inch.

Some models have divots for fitting a writing utensil to mark lumber with. Speed squares made by the Swanson Tool Company also have a diamond shape cutout on the ruler side at 3½ inches.

Usage
Among its basic uses are marking common, hip, valley and hip, or valley jack rafters, laying out stair stringers, determining and marking angles, and making square cuts on boards.

Common lines made using a speed square include perpendicular cut marks and angles for roofs, stairways, and decks.

The tool uses a 0° reference. This means when a board is squared off the tool reads 0°. The angle derived is actually a complementary angle. For example a 22.5° angle is actually 67.5°. The sum of the angles equals 90 degrees (22.5° +67.5°= 90°). It is also obvious from a visual check that where the instruments displays 22.5° is not 22.5°. Many newer slide miters and miter boxes display both angles. Some of the new calculators have a 0° and a 90° references to do angular calculations. This can create confusion if the user does not understand this angular calibration.

To find an angle such as 22.5°, hold the end of the square marked "pivot" against the board and rotate the square until the edge of the board lines up with appropriate number on the degree scale. Draw a line along the side of the square with the inches (pivot side) to indicate the angle for cutting. Use the "Common" scale to cut for Rise over Run.

See also
 Combination square
 Steel square
 Try square

References

External links 

How to Use a Swanson Speed Square as a Framers Square
How To Use A Swanson Speed Square
SPEED SQUARE MADE SIMPLE (video)

Woodworking measuring instruments
Dimensional instruments
American inventions
Squares (tool)